was a Japanese explorer of the late Edo period. He is best known for his exploration of Karafuto, now known as Sakhalin. He mapped areas of northeast Asia then unknown to Japanese.

Biography
Mamiya was born in 1775 in Tsukuba District, Hitachi Province, in what is now Tsukubamirai, Ibaraki Prefecture. Later in life he would become an undercover agent for the Tokugawa shogunate. He is best known for his exploration and mapping of Sakhalin (known to the Japanese as 樺太, Karafuto), which resulted in his discovery that Sakhalin was indeed an island and not connected to the Asian continent, although this had already been discovered by Jean-François de La Pérouse in 1787, who charted most of the Strait of Tartary. The strait would later be named after him in Japan as the Mamiya Strait.

In 1785 Japanese explorers almost reached the Strait of Tartary to the west, Cape Patience to the east and Urup in the Kurils. In 1808 Mamiya sailed up the east coast and Matsuda Denjuro up the west coast. From near Cape Patience, Mamiya crossed the mountains to join Matsuda. The next year Mamiya sailed into the mouth of the Amur River and reached a Chinese trading post. In 1852 Mamiya's maps were published in Europe by Philipp Franz von Siebold.

Although Japan believed that Mamiya had no child, it was announced in 2002 that he had had a daughter with an Ainu woman, and their descendants were living in Hokkaido.

In popular culture
Mamiya is portrayed as one of the two main villains in the manga series Shin Kozure Okami (New Lone Wolf and Cub). In this version, he is the chief henchman of Matsudaira Nobutsuna (and his natural son) and a master of disguise who assumes different identities after murdering the original persons. He is also possibly even more ruthless that Matsudaira, subverting various ninja groups for his own use and using opium as a means of ensnaring and controlling various people, including the Shogun. While Mamiya's historical explorations are mentioned, in this version they have been for a more malign purpose than mere exploration.

Graphic novel writer Sean Michael Wilson featured Mamiya in a biography released as a graphic novel ("Mamiya's Maps: A Samurai Explores Sakhalin").

See also 
12127 Mamiya
Nikolai Rezanov
Philipp Franz von Siebold
Sakhalin
Strait of Tartary
Cape Sōya

References 

Derek Hayes, Historical Atlas of the North Pacific, 2001

Japanese explorers
Explorers of Asia
1775 births
1844 deaths
History of Sakhalin
People from Ibaraki Prefecture
19th-century explorers
Deified Japanese people